Nocardiopsis ansamitocini  is an alkalitolerant bacterium from the genus of Nocardiopsis which has been isolated from soil from the Xinjiang province in China. Nocardiopsis ansamitocini produces ansamitocin P-3.

References

External links 

Type strain of Nocardiopsis ansamitocini at BacDive -  the Bacterial Diversity Metadatabase

Actinomycetales
Bacteria described in 2016